Karan Mahajan (born 2 January 1997) is an Indian cricketer who plays for Railways. He made his Twenty20 debut on 2 January 2016 in the 2015–16 Syed Mushtaq Ali Trophy.

References

External links
 

1997 births
Living people
Indian cricketers
Railways cricketers
People from Kangra, Himachal Pradesh